Alicante Club de Fútbol "B" is a Spanish football team based in Alicante, in the Valencian Community. Founded in 1978 it does not compete at any level, and acted as the reserve team of Alicante CF.

Season to season

5 seasons in Tercera División

Former players
Note: this list includes players that have played at least 100 league games and/or have reached international status.
 Dani García
 Sergio Hinestrosa
 Sipo

External links
Official website 

Football clubs in the Valencian Community
Association football clubs established in 1978
 
Spanish reserve football teams
Divisiones Regionales de Fútbol clubs
1978 establishments in Spain

ca:Alacant Club de Futbol#Equip filial